Al-Merreikh Sports Club also known as Merreikh Al-Fasher is a football club from Al-Fasher, Sudan. They play in the top level of Sudanese professional football, the Sudan Premier League. Their home stadium is Al-Fasher Stadium. It has a capacity of 10,000. Their colours are red and yellow.

External links
Team profile – leballonrond.fr

Football clubs in Sudan